Christopher Ethan Regis (born 11 November 1996) is an English footballer who plays as a midfielder for  club Braintree Town.

A former England under-17 international, he spent his youth career with Arsenal and Southampton, before he joined Colchester United in 2015. He left Colchester in January 2017 without making  first-team appearance for the club, though he did have a loan spell at Maldon & Tiptree. He enjoyed brief stays at Sittingbourne and Farnborough, before he signed a six-month contract with Port Vale in November 2017. He returned to non-league football with Torquay United in July 2018, before moving on to Truro City via Wealdstone in the 2018–19 season. He later played for Coggeshall Town, Cambridge City, Barton Rovers, Chalfont St Peter and Braintree Town.

Club career

Early career
Born in Camden, London, Regis was on the books at Arsenal until his release in 2012. He completed his two-year scholarship with Southampton in 2015, before being released. He signed a development contract with Colchester United after a successful trial spell in August 2015. He joined Isthmian League Division One North side Maldon & Tiptree on a month-long loan deal on 23 February 2016. He made his debut that same day, and scored within just three minutes of a 2–2 draw with Dereham Town. He went on to make a total of five appearances for Steve Ball's "Jammers". Regis signed a one-year contract extension with Colchester in May 2016, but left the Colchester Community Stadium by mutual consent in January 2017 without making a first-team appearance.

Regis joined Isthmian League Division One South side Sittingbourne in March 2017. He started 2017–18 season with Farnborough, making his debut in the opening day 1–0 victory at St Neots Town on 14 August. He played a total of five Southern League Premier Division matches and one FA Cup game for the "Yellows", before he departed Cherrywood Road in September. He had a trial at Bolton Wanderers the following month.

Port Vale
On 7 November 2017, Regis signed for League Two side Port Vale until the end of the 2017–18 season, having impressed on a trial basis. He scored on his debut the same day in the club's EFL Trophy game, just four minutes into a 4–2 victory over Crewe Alexandra at Vale Park. He had been scouted by the club's football advisor John Rudge, who had spotted him during his unsuccessful trial spell at Bolton Wanderers. However manager Neil Aspin soon criticized the player's attitude, saying that Regis failed to warrant even a place on the bench "because his attitude and everything outside of the football has not been good enough". Aspin allowed Regis to leave and find a new club in April 2018.

Non-League
On 31 July 2018, Regis joined newly relegated National League South side Torquay United. However he left the club for National League South rivals Wealdstone on 6 November after "Gulls" manager Gary Johnson told him he was not in his first-team plans at Plainmoor. However he featured just once for the "Stones". He signed with Truro City on 22 March 2019. The "White Tigers" were relegated at the end of the 2018–19 season.

Regis joined Coggeshall Town in the Isthmian League North Division, scoring two goals in eight games at the start of the 2019–20 season. He signed with divisional rivals Cambridge City on 2 November 2019. He scored one goal in  eight games. He joined Southern League Division One Central club Barton Rovers two months later. He later had a spell with Chalfont St Peter and then joined National League South side Braintree Town ahead of the 2022–23 campaign.

International career
Regis was selected to play for the England under-17 team in a friendly tournament in Tórshavn, Faroe Islands in August 2012. He played four matches, and scored one goal against Finland.

Style of play
Regis was a tough tackling box-to-box midfielder.

Career statistics

References

1996 births
Living people
Footballers from the London Borough of Camden
English footballers
England youth international footballers
Black British sportspeople
Association football midfielders
Arsenal F.C. players
Southampton F.C. players
Colchester United F.C. players
Maldon & Tiptree F.C. players
Sittingbourne F.C. players
Farnborough F.C. players
Port Vale F.C. players
Torquay United F.C. players
Wealdstone F.C. players
Truro City F.C. players
Coggeshall Town F.C. players
Cambridge City F.C. players
Barton Rovers F.C. players
Chalfont St Peter A.F.C. players
Braintree Town F.C. players
Isthmian League players
Southern Football League players
English Football League players
National League (English football) players